Thomas Henry Bayly (December 11, 1810 – June 23, 1856) was a nineteenth-century politician, slave owner, lawyer and judge from Virginia, and the son of Congressman Thomas M. Bayly.

Early and family life
Born at the family estate called "Mount Custis" near Drummondtown (now known as Accomac, Virginia), to then Virginia state senator and militia officer Thomas Monteagle Bayly and his wife. Although the senior Bayly served a term in the U.S. House of Representatives (1813-1815) during the War of 1812, he primarily operated a plantation using enslaved labor, and would also later again serve (part-time) in the Virginia House of Delegates and at the Virginia Constitutional Convention of 1829 representing Accomack County. Young Bayly received a private education suitable to his class, and went on to study law at the University of Virginia School of Law, graduating in 1829.

Bayley married Evelyn Harrison May (1810-1897), one of the daughters of Judge John Fitzhugh May of Petersburg, who bore daughters Anna May Bayly (1840-1860) and Evelyn May Tiffany (1851-1929).

Career

Admitted to the bar in 1830, Bayly practiced law in Accomac County, Virginia and also operated the family plantation using enslaved labor, especially after his father's death in 1834. In 1840, he owned 29 slaves. In 1850 Bayly owned 31 slaves (ten 10 years old or younger) as well as land worth $70,000.

Accomack County voters elected and re-elected Bayly as one of their two representatives in the Virginia House of Delegates, where he served (part time) from 1836 to 1842. In 1837 he accepted appointment as brigadier general of the 21st Brigade in the Virginia Militiam and served until 1846. Fellow legislators elected Bayly judge of the Circuit Court of Law and Chancery for Accomack County in 1842, a position he resigned upon election to Congress.

In 1844, Bayly won election as a Democrat to fill a vacancy in the United States House of Representatives caused by the resignation of Henry A. Wise to become U.S. Minister to Brazil during the presidency of John Tyler. Bayly would win re-election several times (although the district name changed from Virginia's 7th congressional district to Virginia's 1st congressional district following redistricting following the 1850 census and adoption of a new Virginia constitution). Bayly served in the House until his death in 1856. He rose to become chairman of the House Committee on Ways and Means from 1849 to 1851 and chairman of the Committee on Foreign Affairs from 1851 to 1855.

Death and legacy

Bayly died on June 23, 1856, during his congressional term, but at his estate, Mount Custis, near Drummondtown, Virginia. He was interred in the family cemetery there, as soon would be his eldest daughter, and decades later, his widow. Bayly also has a cenotaph at Congressional Cemetery in Washington, D.C..
The University of Virginia Art Museum is housed in the Thomas H. Bayly Building.

Elections
1844; Bayly was first elected to the U.S. House of Representatives with 54.5% of the vote, defeating Whig Hitt Carter.
1845; Bayly was re-elected with 53.54% of the vote, defeating Whig George W. Southall.
1847; Bayly was re-elected with 52.47% of the vote, defeating Whig John J. Jones.
1849; Bayly was re-elected with 64.75% of the vote, defeating Whig Francis Mallory.
1851; Bayly was re-elected unopposed.
1853; Bayly was re-elected with 58.93% of the vote, defeating Independents Louis C.H. Finney and George W. Lewis.
1855; Bayly was re-elected with 79.09% of the vote, defeating Independents Robert L. Montague, Richard Lee Turberville Beale, Joseph Eggleston Segar, and a man identified only as Jennings.

See also
List of United States Congress members who died in office (1790–1899)

References

External links

 

Democratic Party members of the Virginia House of Delegates
Virginia state court judges
Virginia lawyers
United States Army generals
University of Virginia School of Law alumni
Burials at the Congressional Cemetery
1856 deaths
1810 births
Democratic Party members of the United States House of Representatives from Virginia
19th-century American lawyers
People from Accomac, Virginia
19th-century American politicians
19th-century American judges